Jack York (fl. 1800) was a Canadian slave in the Western District who was alleged to have raped a white woman named Ruth Tufflemier after breaking into her cabin.

Charge and disappearance
York was arrested in August 1800 and was then was tried for burglary, not rape as the trial took place on 12 September 1800, before Justice William Dummer Powell. York was found guilty and sentenced to death, but the sentence was never carried out. York eventually escaped and disappeared.

Aftermath
York was never captured or seen again.

See also 
List of fugitives from justice who disappeared

Books

References 

Black Canadian people
Canadian escapees
Canadian prisoners sentenced to death
Canadian rapists
Canadian slaves
Date of birth unknown
Date of death unknown
Escapees from Canadian detention
Fugitives
Fugitives wanted by Canada
People of pre-Confederation Canada
Prisoners sentenced to death by Canada